"Hurry Up and Wait" is a song by Welsh rock band Stereophonics, released as the fifth and final single from their second album, Performance and Cocktails (1999), on 8 November 1999. The song reached number 11 on the UK Singles Chart, as did previous single "I Wouldn't Believe Your Radio". It also reached number 23 in Ireland, becoming the band's fifth top-30 hit there.

The song is track three on the album. A live version from Morfa Stadium is on CD2 of the "Hurry Up and Wait" singles. An acoustic version is on CD2 on the "Mr. Writer" single. The music video features the band parodying the 1970 film M*A*S*H.

Track listings
UK CD1
 "Hurry Up and Wait"
 "Angie" (Rolling Stones cover)
 "I Wouldn't Believe Your Radio" (Stuart Cable version)

UK CD2
 "Hurry Up and Wait" (live at Morfa Stadium)
 "I Stopped to Fill My Car Up" (live at Morfa Stadium)
 "Billy Davey's Daughter" (live at Morfa Stadium)

UK cassette single
 "Hurry Up and Wait"
 "Angie" (Rolling Stones cover)

Credits and personnel
Credits are taken from the Performance and Cocktails album booklet.

Recording
 Written from October to November 1997 on a tour bus
 Recorded at Parkgate (East Sussex, England)
 Mastered at Metropolis (London, England)

Personnel

 Kelly Jones – music, lyrics, vocals, guitar
 Richard Jones – music, bass
 Stuart Cable – music, drums
 Marshall Bird – keyboards
 Bird & Bush – production
 Al Clay – mixing
 Ian Cooper – mastering

Charts

References

1997 songs
1999 singles
Rock ballads
Songs written by Kelly Jones
Stereophonics songs
UK Independent Singles Chart number-one singles
V2 Records singles